Grammarctia is a monotypic moth genus in the family Noctuidae erected by Per Olof Christopher Aurivillius in 1900. Its single species, Grammarctia bilinea, was first described by Francis Walker in 1865. It is found in Lesotho, Mozambique, South Africa and Zimbabwe.

References

Arctiinae